Samuel Patrick Gilstrap (May 1, 1907 Chandler, Oklahoma – April 25, 1989 Cocoa Beach, Florida), a Career Foreign Service Officer who served as 
Ambassador Extraordinary and Plenipotentiary to Malawi from July 1964 until October 6, 1965.  He was the first United States Ambassador to Malawi after independence.

Biography
Gilstrap graduated from Oklahoma State University and Cumberland University. He was admitted to the Oklahoma Bar in 1932.

Before joining the Foreign Service in 1947, he practiced law in Oklahoma City, was chief auditor for the Civilian Works Administration and then worked for the Works Progress Administration in Washington, D.C.

In 1961, he was the Consul in Hong Kong and Macau.

He died of a heart attack at the age of 81.

References

Ambassadors of the United States to Malawi
Oklahoma State University alumni
Cumberland University alumni
Consuls general of the United States in Hong Kong and Macau
20th-century American diplomats
1907 births
1989 deaths